Kindelbrück is a Verwaltungsgemeinschaft ("collective municipality") in the district of Sömmerda, in Thuringia, Germany. The seat of the Verwaltungsgemeinschaft is in Kindelbrück.

The Verwaltungsgemeinschaft Kindelbrück consists of the following municipalities:
Büchel
Griefstedt 
Günstedt 
Kindelbrück

References

Verwaltungsgemeinschaften in Thuringia